IHRD Thamarassery or Technical HSS Thamarassery is Technical Higher Secondary School situated in Korangad on the Thamarassery-Balussery State Highway route in Kozhikode district.  It is 2 km far away from Thamarassery Town.  The school is managed by the Institute of Human Resources Development (IHRD) and promote scientific advancement, technological progress and economic growth.  The medium of institution is English.  It is established in 2004.

Courses offered
In THSS Thamarassery there are two groups in the Technical Higher Secondary course viz., Physical Science and Integrated Science. In the Physical Science group, the technical subjects are Computer Information Technology and Electronics Service Technology. Life Science(Biology) is not included in the Physical Science group. For the Integrated Science group, Life Science is included instead of one of the Electronics Service Technology. NCERT Syllabus is followed in the Technical Higher Secondary Course.  For standard XI internal examination will be conducted and the successful completion of standard XII will lead to the awarding of HSLC. (Higher Secondary Leaving certificate) by the Board of Higher Secondary education of the Govt. of Kerala. 50 seats are allowed at the school for each of these courses, totaling to 100 seats per batch every year.

Subjects in Physical Science(PS)
English(1st language), Computer Information Technology (2nd language), Physics, Chemistry, Mathematics, Electronics Service Technology.

Subjects in Integrated Science(IS)
English(1st language), Computer Information Technology (2nd language), Physics, Chemistry, Mathematics, Biology (Botany, Zoology).

Diploma in Data Entry Techniques and PC Maintenance
This is a new course started in Technical HSS from 14 January 2010. Actually it is planning to conduct as Part-time (Morning/Evening Section). So both students and elders can utilize this.

Course Details

 Course: Data Entry Techniques and PC Maintenance
 Duration: 2 Semesters (1 Year)

First Semester Syllabus

 Computer Fundamentals, Data Entry Techniques, Word Processing, English for Communication. 
 Computer Practice-I (OS, Data Entry) 
 Computer Practice-II (Word Processing, Spreadsheet)

Second Semester Syllabus

 PC Maintenance, Networking, Database Applications, Desktop Publishing, Graphics. 
 Computer Practice-III (PC Hardware, Database, Internet) 
 Computer Practice-IV (DTP, Graphics, HTML)

External links

 IHRD Thamarassery

References

Schools in Kozhikode district
2004 establishments in Kerala
High schools and secondary schools in Kerala
Educational institutions established in 2004